Promacrolaelaps is a genus of mites in the family Laelapidae.

Species
 Promacrolaelaps hunteri Costa, 1971

References

Laelapidae